Sewrah Moor is a hamlet in west Cornwall, England, United Kingdom. It lies just north of Stithians.

References

Hamlets in Cornwall